Henry G. Evans (December 6, 1914 – 2000) was an American professional basketball player. Evans played in the National Basketball League for the Pittsburgh Raiders in 1944–45 and averaged 8.5 points per game, which was a high average for basketball during that era.

References

1914 births
2000 deaths
American men's basketball players
Basketball players from Pennsylvania
Centers (basketball)
Forwards (basketball)
People from Sharon, Pennsylvania
Pittsburgh Raiders players